DB Breweries is a New Zealand-based brewing company, owned by Heineken Asia Pacific. Founded in 1930 by Sir Henry Kelliher and W Joseph Coutts, the partners purchased Levers and Co. and the Waitemata Brewery Co. in Otahuhu. Asia Pacific Breweries acquired DB Breweries in 2004, which in turn was bought-out by Heineken International in 2012. The company mainly produces pale lager, whilst its Tui brand is one of the better-known beers in New Zealand, partly due to strong advertising.

History
The company was founded in 1930 by Sir Henry Kelliher with the purchase of Levers and Co. and the Waitemata Brewery Co. in Otahuhu, owned by W.J. Coutts, who became a director.

Coutts' son, Morton Coutts, took over as director in 1946, and later developed a new production process called "continuous fermentation", which enabled beer to be made continuously, without the need to stop and clean between batches. The system proved popular enough to be sold to other brewing companies.

Breweries

DB Breweries (original name
was Dominion Brewery) owns and operates four breweries in New Zealand - Waitemata Brewery (Otahuhu, Auckland), Tui Brewery (Mangatainoka), DB Draught Brewery (Timaru) and Monteith's Brewery (Greymouth). Mainland Brewery was renamed to DB Draught Brewery in 2012 in honour of the brand’s significance in the South Island.

The Tui Brewery was established in 1889 by Henry Wagstaff and Edward Russell.  The main brand is Tui, a 4% abv pale lager, named after a common native New Zealand bird.  The New Zealand Consumers' Institute recently criticised Tui for claiming to be an "East India Pale Ale" because it is a pale lager that bears little resemblance to the traditionally hoppy, bitter or malty India Pale Ale styles.

Yeah right
Tui is promoted through a humorous advertising campaign which uses stereotypes, heavy irony and the phrase Yeah Right.  These advertisements have caused some controversy, such as a billboard in Wellington stating 'Camilla for Queen? Yeah Right' and one stating 'Aucklanders are people too. Yeah Right'. Others to have made the news include "Dad's new husband seems nice - Yeah right" (after New Zealand legalised same-sex marriage); "I nvr txt whl drvn - yeah right"; "When Winston says no, he means no - Yeah right"; "Captain, I know a short cut to the port – Yeah right" (after  ran aground near Tauranga); "Our father in Heaven, Tamaki be your name – Yeah right"; "She clearly married Dotcom for his body – Yeah right".

In 2010 a church was threatened with legal action after parodying the Tui billboard campaign with the slogan, "Atheists have nothing to worry about - Yeah Right".

Radler Trademark 
DB trademarked the word Radler in 2003. This was contested in court by the Society of Beer Advocates who lost the case in 2011 when the Intellectual Property Office of New Zealand ruled in favour of DB breweries after a two-year court battle. The Society of Beer Advocates likens this trademark to being able to trademark the word 'Muesli' for cereal and is disappointed in this result as the word radler is commonly used in Europe. This ruling has also been labelled as 'out of touch with reality' and condemned by some intellectual property experts in New Zealand.

Beer 

 Amstel Light
 Better Beer Company
 Black Dog
 DB Bitter
 DB Draught
 DB Export
 DB Export Dry
 Double Brown
 Flame
 Heineken
 Kingfisher (beer)
 Monteith's
 Murphy's
 Sol
 Tiger
 Tui
 Tuatara

Other Brands 
 Orchard Thieves

Defunct brands 
 DB Lager
 DB Natural 
 Joseph Kuhtze
 Kiwi Lager
 Mako, a low alcoholic beer (2.5% alcohol/volume)

Most of the brand products (Export 33, Export Dry, Export Gold and Monteith's Single Source) have won a Gold Quality Award at the 2011 annual World Quality Selections, organized by Monde Selection.

References

Further reading

External links 
DB Breweries
Tui
My Choice Tui Ad
Export Gold

Breweries of New Zealand
Heineken subsidiaries
Food and drink companies established in 1930
New Zealand companies established in 1930